The 458th Air Expeditionary Group is a provisional United States Air Force unit assigned to United States Air Forces in Europe to activate or inactivate as needed.  The most recent known activation of the unit was at Ramstein Air Base, Germany in 2011.

The group was first activated during World War II as the 458th Bombardment Group.  After training with Consolidated B-24 Liberator heavy bombers in the United States, it deployed to the European Theater of Operations, where it participated in the strategic bombing campaign against Germany.   Following V-E Day, the squadron returned to the United States, where it began training with Boeing B-29 Superfortresses, but was inactivated in October 1945.

The squadron was activated as the 458th Operations Group in 1992, when the air refueling mission was transferred from Strategic Air Command to Air Mobility Command in 1992.  It was inactivated on-ce its assets were reassigned to air mobility units in 1994.  In 2001, the group was converted to provisional status.

History

World War II

Training in the United States
The 458th Bombardment Group was activated at Wendover Field, Utah on 1 July 1943 with the 752d, 753d, 754th and 755th Bombardment Squadrons assigned.  Before the month ended, the group moved to Gowen Field, Idaho to begin organizing, drawing its initial cadre from the 29th Bombardment Group.  The air echelon of the group's cadre immediately departed for Orlando Army Air Base, where they spent the next two months participating in specialized tactical training.  In September 1943, the air and ground echelons of the group were united at Kearns Army Air Base, Utah before proceeding to Wendover to begin the first phase of training with the Consolidated B-24 Liberator.

At Wendover, most of the initial combat crews were assigned to the group. By the end of the year, the 458th completed its training and began moving to the European Theater of Operations. The ground echelon departed its final training base, Tonopah Army Air Field, Nevada, where it had been the first heavy bomber group to train, for the port of embarkation at Camp Shanks, New York, on 1 January 1944, sailing for England on the  while the air echelon assembled at Hamilton Field, then ferried its Liberators to England via the southern ferry route.

Combat in Europe

The group arrived at its combat station, RAF Horsham St. Faith on 1 February 1944, although aircrews had begun arriving on 24 January and the last bombers of the 458th did not arrive until 16 February. It entered the strategic bombing campaign against Germany during Big Week, but its first missions, flown on 24 and 25 February 1944, were diversionary missions, not strikes against the German aircraft manufacturing industry.  On 2 March it began flying strategic bombardment missions.  Its targets included an aircraft manufacturing plant at Brandenburg an der Havel, an airfield near Braunschweig, a fuel depot at Dulmen, oil refineries near Hamburg, marshalling yards at Hamm, an aircraft engine manufacturing factory at Magdeburg, the shipping canal at Minden, aircraft factories at Oschersleben and the industrial area of Saarbrücken.

The group was occasionally diverted from the strategic bombing campaign to conduct air interdiction and close air support missions.  It helped prepare for Operation Overlord, the invasion of Normandy, by striking artillery batteries, V-1 flying bomb and V-2 rocket launching sites, and airfields in France.  On D-Day, it attacked coastal defenses to support the amphibious landings. Afterward, it attacked lines of communication to prevent the movement of enemy personnel and materiel from reaching the battlefield.  It attacked enemy troops during Operation Cobra, the breakout from the beachhead through Saint Lo in late July.  It also flew support missions during the Battle of the Bulge in December 1944 and January 1945 and during Operation Varsity, the airborne attacks across the Rhine in April 1945.  In addition, The group stopped its bombing during September 1944 to transport gasoline to airfields in France to supply Third Army, which had outrun its supply lines (called Operation Truckin').  Although the group flew more than 450 Truckin' sorties to advanced landing grounds in France and lost two aircraft, these were not considered combat missions.  The group flew its last combat mission on 24 April 1945. The group flew 240 combat missions, claiming the destruction of 28 enemy aircraft, while losing 47 Liberators.

The group also had the distinction of being the test squadron for the Army Air Forces' first guided bomb project. In May 1944, ten modified B-24s capable of launching Azon bombs were delivered to the 458th Group.  On 31 May 1944, the group conducted a raid against several bridges in Normandy.

Return and inactivation
During May 1945, the group flew 105 "Trolley" missions. These missions transported ground personnel of the group over target areas on the continent to permit them to see the results of their contributions to the group mission. The group returned to the United States in June 1945, with aircraft beginning to depart for Bradley Field, Connecticut on 14 June. The group assembled at Sioux Falls Army Air Field, South Dakota in July. At Sioux Falls, all personnel who had not been discharged were transferred to other units.

The group reformed at Walker Army Air Field, Kansas, moving to March Field, California in August, once it had achieved 20% manning.  At March, it trained with the Boeing B-29 Superfortress very heavy bomber, but never approached 60% of its manning.  It was inactivated there in October 1945.

Air Mobility Command air refueling
In 1992, Strategic Air Command was inactivated and its bomber and reconnaissance mission was transferred to Air Combat Command (ACC).  Barksdale Air Force Base, Louisiana became an ACC base, but its air refueling squadrons were transferred to Air Mobility Command (AMC).  AMC activated the unit on 1 June 1992 as the 458th Operations Group to control its two McDonnell Douglas KC-10 Extender tanker squadrons at Barksdale.  The group was assigned to the 22d Air Refueling Wing at McConnell Air Force Base, Kansas. From 1 October 1993 until it was inactivated on 1 April 1994, the 71st Air Refueling Squadron, flying Boeing KC-135 Stratotankers was also briefly assigned to the group.  While assigned to the group, these squadrons frequently deployed personnel and aircraft worldwide.

In October 1994, the group and its 2d and 32d Air Refueling Squadrons moved to McGuire Air Force Base, New Jersey.  The group was inactivated on 1 July 1995 when it's KC-10s were reassigned to the 305th Operations Group when Air Mobility Command consolidated its tanker force.

United States Air Forces in Europe expeditionary operations
The unit was converted to provisional status in February 2001 and assigned to United States Air Forces in Europe. In September 2002 the group deployed to Air Force Base Waterkloof, South Africa to participate in the first bilateral exercise between the air forces of South Africa and the United States. More than 200 airmen from Royal Air Force Mildenhall and RAF Lakenheath in England, Ellsworth Air Force Base, S.D., and the Oklahoma Air National Guard participated in the exercise.

The group was again brought briefly to life in 2003, when it was active at Mihail Kogălniceanu International Airport, 26 km northwest of Constanţa, Romania. The group was active from about March to June 2003, charged with maintaining an airbridge at the base to transport supplies and people to the United States Central Command area of responsibility at the beginning of the U.S. Iraq War - Operation Iraqi Freedom.

Lineage
 Constituted as the 458th Bombardment Group (Heavy) on 19 May 1943
 Activated on 1 July 1943
 Redesignated 458th Bombardment Group, Heavy on 16 August 1944
 Redesignated 458th Bombardment Group, Very Heavy 5 August 1945
 Inactivated on 17 October 1945
 Redesignated 458th Operations Group on 1 July 1992 and activated
 Inactivated on 1 July 1995
 Redesignated as 458th Air Expeditionary Group and converted to provisional status on 5 February 2001
 Activated on 27 May 2004
 Inactivated on 11 June 2004
 Activated on 5 May 2006
 Inactivated on 6 June 2006
 Activated on 3 September 2006
 Inactivated on 20 September 2006
 Activated on 26 July 2007
 Inactivated on 20 September 2007
 Activated on 11 October 2007
 Inactivated on 13 November 2007
 Activated on 26 November 2007
 Inactivated on 25 July 2011

Assignments
 Second Air Force, 1 July 1943
 Eighth Air Force, 28 January 1944
 2d Bombardment Division, 8 February 1944
 Second Air Force, 12 July 1944 – 17 October 1945
 22d Air Refueling Wing, 1 June 1992 – 1 July 1995
 United States Air Forces in Europe to activate or inactivate at any time after 5 February 2001
 3d Air and Space Expeditionary Task Force, 27 May 2004 – 11 June 2004
 Attached to Air Command, Europe, 5 May 2006 – 6 June 2006
 Attached to Air Command, Europe, 3 September 2006 – 20 September 2006
 Attached to Third Air Force, 26 July 2007 – 20 September 2007
 Attached to Third Air Force, 11 October 2007 – 13 November 2007
 Attached to Third Air Force, 26 November 2007 - 25 July 2011

Components
 2d Air Refueling Squadron, 1 June 1992 – 1 July 1995
 32d Air Refueling Squadron, 1 June 1992 – 1 July 1995
 37th Expeditionary Airlift Squadron, 27 May 2004 – 11 June 2004
 71st Air Refueling Squadron, 1 October 1993 – 1 April 1994
 81st Expeditionary Fighter Squadron, 27 May 2004 – 11 June 2004
 86th Expeditionary Air Mobility Squadron, 27 May 2004 – 11 June 2004
 435th Expeditionary Medical Operations Squadron, 3 September 2006 – 20 September 2006
 458th Operations Support Squadron, 1 June 1992 – 1 July 1995
 492d Expeditionary Fighter Squadron, 27 May 2004 – 11 June 2004
 494th Expeditionary Fighter Squadron, 27 May 2004 – 11 June 2004
 752d Bombardment Squadron, 1 July 1943 – 17 October 1945
 753d Bombardment Squadron, 1 July 1943 – 17 October 1945
 754th Bombardment Squadron, 1 July 1943 – 17 October 1945
 755th Bombardment Squadron, 1 July 1943 – 17 October 1945
 786th Air Expeditionary Squadron, 3 September 2006 – 20 September 2006
 788th Air Expeditionary Squadron, 26 July 2007 – 20 September 2007; 11 October 2007 - 13 November 2007; 26 November 2007 – 25 July 2011
 Istres Air Base, France
 789th Air Expeditionary Squadron, 11 October 2007 – 13 November 2007; 26 November 2007 - 25 July 2011
 Zaragoza Air Base, Spain

Stations

 Wendover Field, Utah 1 July 1943
 Gowen Field, Idaho, 28 July 1943
 Kearns Army Air Base, Utah, 11 September 1943
 Wendover Field, Utah, 15 September 1943
 Tonopah Army Air Field, Nevada, 31 October to 29 December 1943
 RAF Horsham St. Faith (Station 123), England, January 1944 to 14 June 1945
 Sioux Falls Army Air Field, South Dakota, 12 July 1945
 Walker Army Air Field, Kansas, 25 July 1945
 March Field, California, 21 August – 17 October 1945.

 Barksdale Air Force Base, Louisiana, 1 June 1992
 McGuire Air Force Base, New Jersey, 1 October 1994 – 1 July 1995
 Cherbourg – Maupertus Airport, France, 27 May 2004 – 11 June 2004
 Goulmima, Morocco, 5 May 2006 – 6 June 2006
 Kaduna, Nigeria, 3 September 2006 – 20 September 2006
 Ramstein Air Base, Germany, 26 July 2007 – 20 September 2007
 Ramstein Air Base, Germany, 11 October 2007 – 13 November 2007
 Ramstein Air Base, Germany, 26 November 2007 - 25 July 2011

Aircraft
 Consolidated B-24 Liberator, 1943–1945
 Boeing B-29 Superfortress, 1945
 McDonnell Douglas KC-10 Extender, 1992–1995

Awards and campaigns

See also

 B-24 Liberator units of the United States Army Air Forces

References

Notes
 Explanatory notes

 Citations

Bibliography

 
 
 
 
 
 

 Further reading
 Freeman, Roger A. (1978) Airfields of the Eighth: Then and Now. After the Battle 
 Freeman, Roger A. (2001) The Mighty Eighth: The Colour Record. Cassell

External links
 
  
 
 

458